Constantino Ibarra Navarro (born 13 January 1983), commonly known as Nino, is a Spanish retired footballer who played as a central defender, and is the technical secretary of CD Ciudad de Baza.

Club career
Born in Baza, Granada, Nino made his senior debuts with local CD Baza, then moved to Villarreal CF B in the 2005 summer. In July 2009 he signed with SD Ponferradina, but played just 13 games in his only season, which ended in promotion to Segunda División.

On 30 August 2010 Nino joined AD Alcorcón, in the second level. On 11 September he made his professional debut, in a 1–4 away defeat against UD Las Palmas.

In July 2011 Nino returned to Segunda División B, signing for UD Melilla. He joined Real Jaén for the following campaign, being a starter as the Andalusians promoted and returned to division two after 11 years.

References

External links

1983 births
Living people
Spanish footballers
Footballers from Andalusia
Association football defenders
Segunda División players
Segunda División B players
Tercera División players
Villarreal CF B players
SD Ponferradina players
AD Alcorcón footballers
UD Melilla footballers
Real Jaén footballers
Lorca FC players